Oxydiscites is a genus of ammonites from the Upper Jurassic Kimmeridgian included in the Ochetoceratinae, Oppeliidae. The shell is involute, compressed, with a minute umbilicus, sharp venter with a tall finely toothed keel, and faloid ribbing.

References
Notes

Bibliography
 W.J. Arkell, et al., 1957. Mesozoic Ammonoidea, Treatise on Invertebrate Paleontology, Part L. Geological Society of America and University of Kansas Press.

Late Jurassic ammonites
Ammonitida genera
Fossils of Russia